Adams/Wabash is an 'L' station serving the CTA's Brown, Green, Orange, Pink, and Purple Lines.
Until 1963, it also served interurban trains of the Chicago North Shore and Milwaukee Railroad. It is the closest CTA station to Symphony Center, home of the Chicago Symphony Orchestra, and the Art Institute of Chicago.

History
The station was opened on November 8, 1896, by Lake Street Elevated Railroad before being incorporated into Charles Yerkes's Union Loop in October 1897.

The station originally had separate ticket offices, one for each platform. The station houses were painted sheet metal similar to Madison/Wabash or Quincy stations with Corinthian pilasters and Baroque style window frames.

Each of the platforms was divided in half to create separate boarding areas for the two "L" companies serving the station. Passengers wishing to transfer between trains had to enter the station house and purchase a ticket for the other company. Transfers were simplified in 1913 and passengers were then able to access the entire platform with the same ticket.

In 1940, during the first renovation of the station, a footbridge was built over the tracks. In 1967 fare control was moved to the mezzanine below the tracks, replacing the original station houses on the platform level. Given the high traffic at the station, the two paths (below and above the tracks) have always coexisted.

In 1987, the mezzanine and the platforms were given a new makeover. Exit stairs and control booths were installed at each end of the platforms. The roof of the station was also replaced and extended on the platforms. This work lasted 2 years.

Bus connections
CTA
1 Bronzeville/Union Station (Weekday Rush Hours only)
7 Harrison (Weekdays only)
28 Stony Island (Weekday Rush Hours only)
126 Jackson
151 Sheridan

Notes and references

Notes

References

External links

Adams/Wabash Station Page at Chicago-L.org

Adams Street entrance from Google Maps Street View

CTA Brown Line stations
CTA Green Line stations
CTA Orange Line stations
CTA Purple Line stations
CTA Pink Line stations
Historic American Engineering Record in Chicago
Railway stations in the United States opened in 1896
Former North Shore Line stations